How Much Sorrow Do You Have, also known as The Real Warrior in some countries, is a 2005 Chinese historical drama produced by Beijing HualuBaina Film & TV Co. It was first broadcast on China Television in Taiwan in August 2005. In mainland China it was first broadcast on CCTV-8 in 2006. The title is directly taken from a poem by Li Yu, the protagonist of the drama.

Essentially a soap opera, many relationships are fictionalized, but recorded historical events including the Conquest of Southern Tang by Song are followed relatively faithfully. Over 60 historical characters appear in this series, including 9 monarchs of 5 different states (Later Han, Later Zhou, Later Shu, Song dynasty and Southern Tang).

Plot
Set in the 10th century, the story revolves around two monarchs: Zhao Kuangyin, the first ruler of the Song dynasty, and Li Yu, the last ruler of the Southern Tang dynasty. It is the third TV series focusing on the complex friend-foe relationship between these two historical characters (though in history no such relationship exists), after the 1986 Singaporean series The Sword and the Song and the 1996 Taiwanese series Love, Sword, Mountain & River, but the plot-lines differ somewhat.

Li Yu and Zhao Kuangyin were two emperors during the Five Dynasties and Ten Kingdoms period. Li Yu was kind and respectful, while Zhao Kuangyin was rough and ambitious. They had different backgrounds and attitudes towards life, resulting in two drastically different futures.

Zhao Kuangyin and Zhou Ehuang fell in love at first sight and they planned to visit Southern Tang together. They met Li Yu, and they formed an unlikely friendship. However because of fate, Zhou Ehuang ultimately married Li Yu and she became the Queen.

The marriage between Zhou Ehuang and Li Yu deteriorated when Li Yu also had an affair with Zhou Ehuang's sister, Zhou Jiamin, who later became Queen Zhou the Younger and their second son died at the age of three. Zhou Ehuang soon died from sorrow. Zhao Kuangyin was angered by her death, and wanted to wage war against Southern Tang.

After Zhao Kuangyin conquered Southern Tang and the other kingdoms, he spared Li Yu and his family. He also unexpectedly met Madame Huarui, who looked exactly like Zhou Ehuang.

Cast

Nicky Wu as Li Yu
Liu Tao as Zhou Ehuang
Liu Tao also as Madame Huarui
Howie Huang as Zhao Kuangyin
Wu Yue as Zhao Kuangyi
Pan Hong as Empress Zhong
Xiong Naijin as Zhou Jiamin, Queen Zhou the Younger
Serina Liu as Yaoniang
Wang Hui as Zhao Pu
Chunyu Shanshan as Pei Houde
Yi Zhaobo as Jiang Zheng
Ye Xinyu as Li Hongji
Zhang Shuai as Li Congshan
Wu Lanhui as Li Jing
Shen Meng-sheng as Zhao Hongyin
He Zhonghua as Meng Chang
Chen Zhihui as Shi Shouxin
Shi Ke as Qing'er
Wang Xinmin as Zhang Dejun
Yuan Min as Lin Renzhao
Chen Dacheng as Zhou Zong
Liu Jie as Zhou Zong's wife
Cai Jing as Sapo
Jin Demao as Han Xizai
Chen Weiguo as Chen Qiao
Zhu Yikun as Fan Ruoshui
Gao Yuqing as Xu You
Liu Jiang as Feng Yansi
Sui Shuyang as Feng Yanlu
Li Fei as Chai Rong
Mo Meilin as Wang Yansheng
Chen Hai as Pan You
Xu Ming as Zhong Mo
Zhang Lei as Li Jingsui
Chen Bin as Sun Sheng
Wu Hongwu as Cao Bin
Shen Xiaoyan as Li Yanniang
Jia Hong as Han Tong
Li Meng as Gao Huaide
Zhang Liang as Murong Yanzhao
Zuo Baixue as Tao Gu
Zhong Xinpei as Yan Xu
Zou Na as Palace-Maid Huang
Zhao Gang as Guo Wei
Shi Lei as Guo Chong
Cai Gang as Fan Zhi
Zhu Mingming as Miao Xun
Shi Yajun as Empress Dowager Li
Tang Yajun as Chu Zhaofu
Zhyang Han as Wang Shenqi
Zhou Kai as Kang Sheng
Yin Xinhao as Liu Chengyou
Cao Shiping as Wang Pu
Ju Bo as Pan Mei
Peng Zhenzhong as Shi Yande
Zhan Lei as Li Chuyun
Miao Liang as Han Chongyun
Zhou Tingchao as Wang Quanbin
Qian Minghua as Liu Guangyi
Yan Pei as Chang Sheng
Yue Ranting as Bi Zhu
Hu Rong as Xiaoyu
Wang Luoting as Xiao Yan
Jia Shijun as Zha Wenhui
Guo Qiming as Fan Xijiang
Xu Jiawei as Guo Zongxun
Duan Jing as Empress Dowager Fu
Lu Wenzhong as Chen Jue
Ding Jianguo as Li Deming
Lu Zhong as Wang Chongzhi
Zhong Hanhao as Chang Mengxi
Song Jianhua as Bian Hao
Li Fan as Yuan Congfan
Sui Shuyang as Wang Zhaoyuan
Rao Min as Empress Wang
Tang Yifan as Li Zhongxuan
Ji Tianfu as Li Zhongyu
Zhang Chaoli as Fu Gui

References

2005 Chinese television series debuts
Television series set in the Five Dynasties and Ten Kingdoms period
Television series set in the Northern Song
Mandarin-language television shows
Chinese historical television series